Jun O'Hara, legally named , is a Japanese mathematician who works on the fields of low-dimensional topology and knot theory. He is a professor at Chiba University.

He is famous for his discovery of Möbius energy, a type of knot energy.

He was born on 29 March 1963 in Hiroshima, Japan.

He was a PhD student of Takashi Tsuboi at the University of Tokyo.

Selected publications
Energy of knots and conformal geometry. World Scientific, Singapore,  (2003).
"Energy of a knot", Topology v. 30 n. 2, pp. 241–247 (1991)

See also
Knot energy

References

1963 births
People from Hiroshima
University of Tokyo alumni
Topologists
Living people
20th-century Japanese mathematicians
21st-century Japanese mathematicians
Academic staff of Tokyo Metropolitan University